Jinfeng Township is a rural township in Xinhua County, Hunan Province, People's Republic of China.

Administrative division
, it has 13 villages under its administration. They are: Jinfeng Village, Dawan Village, Guanghui Village, Weijia Village, Yangque Village, Yanshanwan Village, Jiaqiao Village, Tielu Village, Huaban Village, Jiulongshan Village, Daping Village, Sunyashan Village, and Pingyou Village.

References

Divisions of Xinhua County
Townships of Hunan